III (Anh. III; third Annex) of the 1978 edition of the Deutsch catalogue lists thirteen copies by Franz Schubert, of compositions by other composers.

Table

Legend

List

|-
| data-sort-value="999.0999301" |
| data-sort-value="999.301" | Anh.III/1
| data-sort-value="ZZZZ" |
| data-sort-value="ZZZZ" |
| data-sort-value="ZZZZ" |
| data-sort-value="Schubert's copy of canons, 9, by Michael Haydn" | Schubert's copy of nine canons by Michael Haydn and other composers: Nos. 1, 3, 4 and 6 by M. Haydn – No. 2 by M. or J. Haydn – No. 5 by  – No. 9 by Mozart
| data-sort-value="text Es packe dich das Gluck beim Kragen" | 1. Es packe dich das Glück beim Kragen (F major) – 2. Vom Glück sei alles dir beschert (B major) – 3. Glück fehl dir vor allem (G major) – 4. Wohlsein und Freude (C major) – 5. Drum habe Dank, o Vater Hayden – 6. Adam hat siebn Söhn (F major) – 7. Cato, Plato, Cicero (F major) – 8. Was i beim Tag mit der Leiern gwinn (E minor) – 9. Alleluia (C major)
| data-sort-value="1810-06-21" | summer1810
| data-sort-value="For five voices" | No. 1: for five voices (MH 577, also K. Anh. C.10.14) – No. 2: for four voices (MH 619 or Hob. XXVIIb:Bb1) – No. 3: for four voices (MH 582) – No. 4: for five voices (MH 584) – No. 5: for nine voices – No. 6: for four voices (MH 699, also K. 562b) – No. 7: (MH 714) – No. 8: (MH 723) – No. 9: for four voices
|-
| data-sort-value="999.0999302" |
| data-sort-value="999.302" | Anh.III/2
| data-sort-value="ZZZZ" |
| data-sort-value="ZZZZ" |
| data-sort-value="ZZZZ" |
| data-sort-value="Schubert's copy of Roser's Teilung der Erde, Die" | Schubert's copy of 's 
| data-sort-value="text Nehmt hin die Welt! rief Zeus aus seinen Hohen" | Nehmt hin die Welt! rief Zeus aus seinen Höhen
| data-sort-value="1810-01-01" | 
| data-sort-value="Text by Schiller, Friedrich, Nehmt hin die Welt! rief Zeus aus seinen Hohen" | Text by Schiller; Also Hob. XXVIa:C1
|-
| data-sort-value="999.0999303" |
| data-sort-value="999.303" | Anh.III/3
| data-sort-value="ZZZZ" |
| data-sort-value="ZZZZ" |
| data-sort-value="ZZZZ" |
| Schubert's copy of part of Mozart's Symphony No. 41
| data-sort-value="key C major" | C major
| data-sort-value="1813-03-29" | after29/3/1813
| Start of Minuet (3rd movement)
|-
| data-sort-value="999.0999304" |
| data-sort-value="999.304" | Anh.III/4
| data-sort-value="ZZZZ" |
| data-sort-value="ZZZZ" |
| data-sort-value="ZZZZ" |
| data-sort-value="Schubert's copy of canon, 1, from Zumsteeg's Elbondocani" | Schubert's copy of a canon from Zumsteeg's Elbondocani
| data-sort-value="text Hoffnung Kind des Himmels" | Hoffnung Kind des Himmels
| data-sort-value="1813-09-20" | beforefall 1813?
| data-sort-value="Text by Haug, Friedrich, Hoffnung Kind des Himmels"| Text by Haug (transl. from French); For sstb and piano
|-
| data-sort-value="999.0999305" |
| data-sort-value="999.305" | Anh.III/5
| data-sort-value="ZZZZ" |
| data-sort-value="ZZZZ" |
| data-sort-value="ZZZZ" |
| Schubert's copy of Zumsteeg's Chor der Derwische
| data-sort-value="text Ein Gott, ein wahrer Gott ist nur" | Ein Gott, ein wahrer Gott ist nur
| data-sort-value="1813-03-21" | spring1813?
| data-sort-value="Text by Iffland, August Wilhelm, Ein Gott, ein wahrer Gott ist nur" | Text by Iffland, from Achmet und Zenide; for ttb
|-
| data-sort-value="085" | 85
| data-sort-value="999.306" | Anh.III/6
| data-sort-value="ZZZZ" |
| data-sort-value="ZZZZ" |
| data-sort-value="ZZZZ" |
| data-sort-value="Schubert's copy of Preindl's Offertory" | Schubert's copy of 's Offertory "Clamavi ad te", Op. 16
| data-sort-value="key C major" | C major
| data-sort-value="1813-11-01" | November1813?
| Only the start of the s part is extant in Schubert's copy
|-
| data-sort-value="999.0999307" |
| data-sort-value="999.307" | Anh.III/7
| data-sort-value="ZZZZ" |
| data-sort-value="ZZZZ" |
| data-sort-value="ZZZZ" |
| data-sort-value="Schubert's copy of Reichardt's Monolog aus Goethe's Iphigenie" | Schubert's copy of Reichardt's 
| data-sort-value="text Heraus in eure Schatten" | Heraus in eure Schatten
| data-sort-value="1815-01-01" | 1815
| data-sort-value="Text by Goethe, Johann Wolfgang von from Iphigenia in Tauris" | Text by Goethe, from Iphigenia in Tauris; For voice, women's choir and piano
|-
| data-sort-value="999.0999308" |
| data-sort-value="999.308" | Anh.III/8
| data-sort-value="ZZZZ" |
| data-sort-value="ZZZZ" |
| data-sort-value="ZZZZ" |
| Schubert's copy of part of Beethoven's Symphony No. 4
| data-sort-value="key B-flat major" | B major
| data-sort-value="1821-01-01" | 1821 orlater
| Start of Adagio, Allegro vivace (1st movement)
|-
| data-sort-value="999.0999309" |
| data-sort-value="999.309" | Anh.III/9
| data-sort-value="ZZZZ" |
| data-sort-value="ZZZZ" |
| data-sort-value="ZZZZ" |
| data-sort-value="Schubert's copy of the organ part of M. Haydn's Deutsches Hochamt, MH 560" | Schubert's copy of the organ part of M. Haydn's Deutsches Hochamt, MH 560
| data-sort-value="text Hier liegt vor deiner Majestat" | Hier liegt vor deiner MajestätB major
| data-sort-value="1828-11-19" | ?
| data-sort-value="Text by Kohlbrenner, Franz Seraph von, Hier liegt vor deiner Majestat"| Text by Kohlbrenner; For SATB and organ; Schubert's autograph lost
|-
| data-sort-value="999.0999310" |
| data-sort-value="999.310" | Anh.III/10
| data-sort-value="ZZZZ" |
| data-sort-value="ZZZZ" |
| data-sort-value="ZZZZ" |
| data-sort-value="Schubert's copy of Preindl's Mass" | Schubert's copy of 's Mass in C major
| data-sort-value="key C major" | C majorKyrie – Gloria – Credo – Sanctus & Benedictus – Agnus Dei
| data-sort-value="1821-01-01" | 1821 orlater
| data-sort-value="Text: Mass ordinary 14" | Text: Mass ordinary (Schubert's settings: , 31, 45, 49, 56, 66, 105, 167, 324, 452, 678, 755 and 950); For SATB and orchestra; Copied by Schubert and his brother Ferdinand
|-
| data-sort-value="092" | 92
| data-sort-value="999.311" | Anh.III/11
| data-sort-value="ZZZZ" |
| data-sort-value="ZZZZ" |
| data-sort-value="ZZZZ" |
| data-sort-value="Schubert's copy of canon, 1, by Mozart, K. 440d" | Schubert's copy of a canon by Mozart, K. 440d (formerly K. Anh. 134), after 
| data-sort-value="text Lass immer in der Jugend Glanz" | Laß immer in der Jugend Glanz
| data-sort-value="1828-11-19" | ?
| For two voices; Schubert's autograph lost
|-
| 127
| data-sort-value="999.312" | Anh.III/12
| data-sort-value="ZZZZ" |
| data-sort-value="ZZZZ" |
| data-sort-value="ZZZZ" |
| data-sort-value="Schubert's copy of canon, 1, by Mozart's, K. 230/382b" | Schubert's copy of a canon  by Mozart, 
| data-sort-value="text Selig, selig alle, die im Herrn entschliefen!" | Selig, selig alle, die im Herrn entschliefen!
| data-sort-value="1828-11-19" | ?
| data-sort-value="Text by Holty, Ludwig Heinrich Christoph, Selig, selig alle, die im Herrn entschliefen!" | Text by Hölty; For two voices; Schubert's autograph lost
|-
| data-sort-value="999.0999313" |
| data-sort-value="999.313" | Anh.III/13
| data-sort-value="ZZZZ" |
| data-sort-value="ZZZZ" |
| data-sort-value="ZZZZ" |
| Schubert's copy of Beethoven's 
| data-sort-value="text Wenn die Sonne niedersinket" | Wenn die Sonne niedersinket
| data-sort-value="1820-04-01" | afterMarch 1820
| data-sort-value="Text by Goeble, Heinrich, Wenn die Sonne niedersinket" | Text by Goeble; Schubert's autograph transposed, incomplete
|}

Lists of compositions by Franz Schubert
Compositions by Franz Schubert